Zak Kostopoulos was killed on a busy street near Omonoia Square, Athens during the day on 21 September 2018, first beaten by civilians and later by the police. The victim, an LGBT rights activist in Greece, died on the way to the hospital. The suspects in the case are awaiting trial for inflicting fatal bodily harm.

Victim

Zak Kostopoulos (born 22 August 1985) was a Greek-American activist, for the rights of LGBT people, those who were HIV positive, sex workers and refugees. He was also a drag performer under the name Zackie Oh.

Death
It is unknown how Kostopoulos entered the jewelry shop on Gladstonos street where his killing began. Another Greek LGBT activist, said that he entered the shop to escape an altercation on the street. Videos of the killing show Kostopoulos unarmed and trying to escape from the store as he is being attacked by the store's owner and another man, a real estate agent who was a high-ranking member of the National Front. After the window was broken by the owner, Kostopoulos crawled out and fell to the ground after being kicked in the head. Police arrived at the scene. Despite Kostopoulos' injuries, the police apprehended and handcuffed him and also beat him. Kostopoulos died on the way to the hospital. Eyewitness Philippos Karagiorgis described the killing as a "lynching" and criticized onlookers for "watching as if it was a movie" instead of intervening.

Investigations
The police did not immediately arrest the perpetrators of the killing, interview all of the witnesses present, or seal off the crime scene. Therefore, the store owner had the opportunity to clean up potentially incriminating evidence. Initial Greek media reports said that Kostopoulos was a drug addict who was committing an armed robbery of the jewelry shop. However, a forensic analysis found no traces of drugs in his system and his fingerprints were not on any of the knives present at the scene of the crime. The coroner found that he had died of multiple injuries especially to his head. Kostopoulos' family commissioned the UK-based research center Forensic Architecture to investigate his death. Forensic Architecture found that the police had overlooked twelve cameras that were recording the scene and failed to question a key witness who appeared in the footage. As a result of the Forensic Architecture investigation, the case was reopened in 2019.

The trial of the shop owner, another man who was filmed beating Kostopoulos, and four police officers for inflicting "fatal bodily harm", started on 20 October 2021. The trial, which judge Giorgos Kassimis described as "historic", was originally scheduled for October 2020 but was delayed because of the COVID-19 pandemic. Kostopoulos' family wanted his death to be tried as murder.

On 3 May 2022, two men were found guilty, while the four police officers who faced charges for their involvement were found innocent.

Legacy
Kostopoulos was buried in the town of Kirra where he grew up. In 2018, 2019, and 2021 people organized marches in Athens to commemorate Kostopoulos' death and call for justice against his killers. The slogan "Zackie lives, smash the Nazis"  was chanted at events across the country.

References

Notes

Further reading

Violence against LGBT people in Europe
2018 in Greece
2010s in Athens
Police brutality in the 2010s
September 2018 events in Europe